Gigia Talarico is a Chilean-born Bolivian writer and poet.

Literary work

As a writer she has published eight children's books: Comiendo estrellas, El caracol gigante (Chile), Los tres deseos, Un puñado de sueños, La maleta de Esperanza, Cuentos de niños y gatos. These books have been republished several times and some of them are used in many educational institutions. In 1997, she was awarded with the National Prize of the Education Reform (8 year-olds category) for her work as a children's literature writer. In addition to her writings, she is presently working on the second volume of a children's literature anthology entitled Dicen que en mi país (2010, and currently in its second edition), which includes the most important storytellers in Bolivia.

Her poetry work includes Ángeles de Fuego (Torre de Papel, 2001), Púrpura (Plural, 2007) and her latest collection of poems, La manzana dorada (El país, 2013). This last book recently won the National Municipal Prize Santa Cruz de la Sierra. Her poetry has received several prizes and is present in several national and international anthologies. In 2014, she won the Dante Alighieri Unique Prize for the best poetry book published in 201g3-2014 with The Golden Apple.

Literary activities

The Argentinian publisher house Prosa American  published a book by her entitled El espíritu de la palabra (PROSA, 2010) a poetry investigation essay based on the architectural and poetic creation carried out in the well renowned Ciudad abierta, located in Ritoque, Chile. This work was the result of research and interviews with Alberto Cruz, one of the ideologues and creators.

For two years, she was responsible with other friends, for the annual poetry event Arte Poética e Integración held in Santa Cruz, which had the participation of poets from different South American countries. Since then, she organizes one youth poetry contest every year, whose goal is to encourage the poetic and pictorial development of young people. She also writes for the Argentinian cultural magazine PROA en las Letras y en las Artes, the oldest and most read cultural publication in Spanish all over South America, recently renamed PROSA. This magazine has recently declared Giga as Ambassador of South American Poetry.

In 2008 she published her first novel La sonrisa cortada (Argentina and Bolivia), currently in its third edition. She is currently working on a novel about a poetic journey through the Amazon in the 1940s and the influences of this constructivist experience in the current South American poetry. In addition, she is working on a new poetry book entitled Fisuras.

References

Citations

General sources

External links
 Official website

20th-century Chilean poets
20th-century Chilean women writers
21st-century Bolivian poets
21st-century Chilean poets
21st-century Chilean women writers
Bolivian women poets
Chilean women poets
Living people
Year of birth missing (living people)